Langfuhr (foaled 1992 in Ontario) is a Canadian Hall of Fame  Thoroughbred racehorse.

Background
Owned and bred by noted German-born Canadian horseman Gus Schickedanz, he was named for Langfuhr the former German name for one of the boroughs of the Northern Polish city of Danzig. Langfuhr's sire Danzig was named after that city.

Racing career
Langfuhr raced in Canada and the United States where he won three Grade 1 races. However, he is better known as the sire of a number of accomplished racehorses.

In 1996, Langfuhr's wins included the American Grade II Forego Handicap at Saratoga Race Course and the Grade I Vosburgh Stakes at Belmont Park. His performances that year earned  him Canadian Champion Sprint Horse honors.

After winning the 1997 Carter Handicap at Aqueduct Racetrack in April and May's Metropolitan Handicap at Belmont Park, an injury ended Langfuhr's racing career and he was retired to stud.

Stud career
Retired to stud duty at Lane's End Farm in Versailles, Kentucky, Langfuhr was the 2005 leading sire in North America by number of winners and as of September 8, 2007 has sired 49 stakes winners including:
 Wando - 2003 Canadian Triple Crown Champion and Canadian Horse of the Year
 Mobil - 2004 Canadian Champion Older Horse
 Kimchi - 2006 Canadian Champion Three-Year-Old Filly
 Imperial Gesture – 2002 winner of the Grade 1 Beldame Stakes and Gazelle Handicap
 Lawyer Ron - won 2006 Arkansas Derby, 2007 Whitney Handicap and Woodward Stakes
 Jambalaya - winner of the 2007 Grade I Gulfstream Park Breeders' Cup Turf Stakes and the Arlington Million.
 Apollo Kentucky - 2016 winner of the Grade 1 Tokyo Daishōten

References
 Langfuhr's pedigree and racing stats
 Langfuhr at the Canadian Horse Racing Hall of Fame
 Langfuhr profile and statistics at Lane's End Farm

1992 racehorse births
Racehorses bred in Ontario
Racehorses trained in Canada
Canadian Horse Racing Hall of Fame inductees
Thoroughbred family 2-n